Ariadna taprobanica is a species of spider of the genus Ariadna. It is endemic to Sri Lanka.

See also 
 List of Segestriidae species

References

Segestriidae
Endemic fauna of Sri Lanka
Spiders of Asia
Spiders described in 1906